The Jacksonville Maritime Museum (JMM) – which became known as the Jacksonville Maritime Heritage Center – told the maritime history of Jacksonville, Florida, United States, and the First Coast through its connection to the St. Johns River and the Atlantic Ocean.

History
The Jacksonville Maritime Heritage Center began as the Jacksonville Maritime Museum in 1987 and was operated by the Jacksonville Maritime Museum Society, Inc., a non-profit, 501(c)(3) organization. Its goal was to provide a resource that illustrated the local impact of maritime trade and the many aspects of the maritime environment.

The Jacksonville Landing allowed the museum to use unoccupied retail space to display their collection of large scale model ships for seven years, beginning in 1990. Then Society President Lockhart explained, "Every time they would get a new tenant, they would move us to another empty space." That situation occurred five times in seven years. In mid-November 1997, the museum was given seven days to vacate in preparation for a new tenant. "This time, they just ran out of empty space," commented Lockhart. Many exhibits were put into storage or loaned.

Beginning in 1993, their primary facility was located in a 1500 sq.ft² enclosed pavilion on the South bank of the Jacksonville Riverwalk, near Friendship Fountain. It remained there for nearly 18 years until it returned to the Jacksonville Landing and reopened in January, 2011 for a lower monthly rent.
  
The new location was on the ground floor, east side, and accommodated the display of more items. Ship models that were loaned out for display at other places were returned to the Jacksonville Maritime Heritage Center. The space included an interactive children's display and a theatre with seating for 60.

Dissolution 
At the society's board of directors meeting in August 2015, they voted to dissolve the museum at the end of the calendar year. The museum received no financial support from the city government, and memberships and donations were not enough to cover the $45,000 budget of the volunteer-run non-profit.

Collection  
The museum housed hundreds of artifacts and included permanent exhibits on the aircraft carrier  and Napoleon B. Broward’s Three Friends Tugboat. Popular exhibits included St. Johns Riverboats, Shipbuilding in Jacksonville and the  diorama.

The largest model formerly on display in the museum was that of the World War II U. S. Navy heavy cruiser, . The  model was loaned to Jacksonville by its builder, Ray Arthur, then given to the Frazier Museum after the museum declared it surplus to its needs.

References

External links
Official website (Archive copy of homepage from November 17, 2014)

Museums in Jacksonville, Florida
Defunct museums in Florida
Maritime museums in Florida
Non-profit organizations based in Jacksonville, Florida
Downtown Jacksonville
1985 establishments in Florida
Museums established in 1985
2015 disestablishments in Florida
Museums disestablished in 2015